Eugene O'Connell (3 October 1894 – 2 February 1956) was an Irish hurler. His championship career with the Cork senior team lasted from 1919 until 1926.

References

1894 births
1956 deaths
Blackrock National Hurling Club hurlers
Cork inter-county hurlers